James Wilcox (born April 4, 1949 in Hammond, Louisiana) is an American novelist and a professor at Louisiana State University in Baton Rouge. James Wilcox worked at Random House and Doubleday in New York after graduating from Yale. Wilcox was a recipient of a Guggenheim Fellowship in 1986.

Wilcox is the author of nine comic novels mostly set in, or featuring characters from, the fictional town of Tula Springs, Louisiana:
 Modern Baptists (1983)
 North Gladiola (1985)
 Miss Undine's Living Room (1987)
 Sort of Rich (1989)
 Polite Sex (1991)
 Guest of a Sinner (1993)
 Plain and Normal (1998)
 Heavenly Days (2003)
 Hunk City (2007)
Wilcox's first book Modern Baptists remains his best known work.

Guest of a Sinner is set in New York City with characters from Tallahassee. Polite Sex and Plain and Normal are set mainly in New York City, but they do have a few characters who come from Tula Springs.

Wilcox is also the author of three short stories that were published in The New Yorker between 1981 and 1986. He was the subject of an article by James B. Stewart in The New Yorker's 1994 summer fiction issue; entitled "Moby Dick in Manhattan", it detailed his struggle to survive as a writer devoted purely to literary fiction.

Wilcox’s book reviews have appeared in The New York Times Book Review, The Los Angeles Times Book Review, and Elle. He has been a judge for the Hemingway Foundation/PEN Award for the best first-published book of fiction by an American writer published in 1991; for the 1994 Barnes & Noble Discover Great New Writers Award; for the Pirate’s Alley Faulkner Society novella contest in 1999; and for the Eudora Welty Prize for Fiction given by The Southern Review in 2005. He was the recipient of an ATLAS grant for 2007-08. Wilcox was the recipient of the 2011 Louisiana Writer Award presented by the Louisiana Center for the Book in the State Library of Louisiana at its annual Louisiana Book Festival.

He was the Robert Penn Warren Professor at LSU from 2004–2007 and then Donald and Velvia Crumbley Professor from 2007–2010. LSU recognized him as the 2008 Distinguished Research Master of Arts, Humanities, & Social Sciences. In 2009 he won an LSU Distinguished Faculty Award. Wilcox currently has held the MacCurdy Distinguished Professorship since 2010. He also serves as Director of Creative Writing at LSU.

References

External links 
 New Yorker article "Moby Dick in Manhattan"
 New York Times review of Hunk City
 Louisiana Writer Award: James Wilcox

1949 births
20th-century American novelists
21st-century American novelists
American male novelists
Living people
Louisiana State University faculty
Writers from Baton Rouge, Louisiana
Yale University alumni
People from Hammond, Louisiana
American male short story writers
20th-century American short story writers
21st-century American short story writers
20th-century American male writers
21st-century American male writers
Novelists from Louisiana